Oakland is an officially recognized neighborhood of Atlanta consisting of only four blocks. It is bounded by:
 the Downtown Connector freeway on the west, across which is Downtown Atlanta and the Georgia State Capitol building
 Grant Street on the east, across which is one block of the Grant Park (Atlanta) neighborhood and then the historic Oakland Cemetery (Atlanta)
 Martin Luther King Jr. Drive and the Grant Park (Atlanta) and Capitol Gateway neighborhoods on the south
 the MARTA east-west rail line on the north

Oakland contains the disused Corey smokestack; Mattress Factory Lofts, site of the former Southern Spring Bedding factory, with some buildings built as far back as 1864;
and Crown Candy Lofts.

References 

Neighborhoods in Atlanta